Uriel Miron (born 1968) is an Israeli artist and sculptor.

Biography
Uriel Miron was born in Tel Aviv in 1968. His grandmother is Dvora Schocken, An Israeli art collector. For many years he lived with his father, the literary critic Dan Miron, in the United States. In the 1980s he learned Literature at Yale University. in the 1990s he returned to live in Israel and studied Art at Bezalel. Many of his sculptures based on hybrid skeletons and anatomies originate in such ordinary objects and materials as plastic lawn chairs or cardboard boxes.

Gallery

Education
1986–1990 Yale University, B.A. in literature, magna cum laude, with distinction in the major
1990–1995 Bezalel, Jerusalem, art, graduated with Honors
1996–1998 School of Visual Arts, New York, M.F.A. cum laude

Prizes and awards
1989 Dorot Fund grant for photography project
1995 Prize for Excellence in Art, Bezalel Academy of Arts and Design, Jerusalem
1996–1998, Excellent Achievement Prize, School of Visual Arts, New York City
1998 Faculty Committee Scholarship, School of Visual Arts, New York City
2002 Paula Rhodes Memorial Award
2005 Artists' achievement award, Ministry of Education, Culture and Sport, Israel
2009 Scholarship, Rabinovich Foundation, Tel Aviv
2012 Support of an Artist for Exhibiting Abroad, The Council of Art and Culture at the National Lottery
2013 Prize in Visual Arts, Ministry of Culture and Sport, Israel

References

External links
Uriel Miron's web site

Israeli sculptors
Living people
1968 births
Israeli contemporary artists